The California Cup Juvenile Fillies Stakes is an American thoroughbred horse race run annually at Santa Anita Park in Arcadia, California during its Oak Tree Racing Association meet in the fall of the year. Raced on dirt over a distance of  1/16, it open to two-year-old filliess bred in the state of California. The event currently offers a purse of $125,000 and a trophy.

The California Cup Juvenile Fillies Stakes is part of the "California Cup Day" series of races intended to call attention to, and to honor, the California Thoroughbred racing and breeding industry.

Past winners

 2011 - Starlight Magic
 2010 - Swiss Wild Cat
 2009 - La Nez
 2008 - Saucey Evening (Garrett Gomez)
 2007 - Runforthemoneybaby (Tyler Baze) 
 2006 - Romance Is Diane
 2005 - Bai and Bai
 2004 - Lady Truffles
 2003 - House of Fortune
 2002 - Summer Wind Dancer
 2001 - Lady George
 2000 - Euro Empire
 1999 - Cover Gal
 1998 - Lacquaria
 1997 - Career Collection
 1996 - Rexy Sexy
 1995 - Wheatly Special
 1994 - Fabulouspersuasion
 1993 - Private Persuasion
 1992 - Incindress
 1991 - Don B's Princess
 1990 - Theresa's Pleasure

References
 Oak Tree racing meet at Santa Anita
 The California Cup Juvenile Fillies Stakes at Pedigree Quer.com

Horse races in California
Santa Anita Park
Graded stakes races in the United States
Flat horse races for two-year-old fillies
Racing series for horses